Pueblo County School District 70 (D70) is a school district headquartered in unincorporated Pueblo County, Colorado, near Pueblo.

Schools

High schools:
 Pueblo County High School (Vineland, in an unincorporated area)
 Pueblo West High School (Pueblo West, in an unincorporated area)
 Rye High School (unincorporated area, near Rye)

K-8 schools:
 Beulah School of Natural Sciences  (Beulah)

Middle schools:
 Craver Middle School (Colorado City)
 Pleasant View Middle School
 Liberty Point International School (formerly Pueblo West Middle School) (Pueblo West)
 Skyview Middle School (Pueblo West)
 Vineland Middle School (Vineland)

Elementary schools:
 Avondale Elementary School
 Cedar Ridge Elementary School
 Desert Sage Elementary School
 Liberty Point Elementary School
 North Mesa Elementary School
 Prairie Winds Elementary School
 Rye Elementary School
 South Mesa Elementary School
 Sierra Vista Elementary School
 Vineland Elementary School

References

External links
 

School districts in Colorado
Education in Pueblo County, Colorado